Jaminia is a genus of air-breathing land snails, terrestrial pulmonate gastropod mollusks in the subfamily Eninae of the family Enidae.

Species
 Jaminia loewii (Philippi, 1844)
 Jaminia quadridens (O. F. Müller, 1774)
 Jaminia thiesseana (Westerlund & Blanc, 1879)
Species brought into synonymy
 Jaminia corrugata Preston, 1912: synonym of Nesopupa corrugata (Preston, 1912): synonym of Insulipupa corrugata (Preston, 1912) (original combination)
 Jaminia desiderata Preston, 1911: synonym of Lauria desiderata (Preston, 1911)
 Jaminia heterostropha Risso, 1826: synonym of Jaminia quadridens quadridens (O. F. Müller, 1774) (junior synonym)
 Jaminia multidentata Risso, 1826: synonym of Granaria variabilis (Draparnaud, 1801) (junior synonym)
 Jaminia niso Risso, 1826: synonym of Jaminia quadridens quadridens (O. F. Müller, 1774) (junior synonym)
 Jaminia proscripta E. A. Smith, 1905: synonym of Nesopupa proscripta (E. A. Smith, 1905) (original combination)
 Jaminia quinquelamellata Risso, 1826: synonym of Solatopupa similis (Bruguière, 1792) (junior synonym)
 Jaminia septemdentata Risso, 1826: synonym of Chondrina avenacea avenacea (Bruguière, 1792) (junior synonym)

References

 Arnaud, P. M., 1978. Révision des taxa malacologiques méditerrannéens introduits par Antoine Risso. Annales du Muséum d'Histoire Naturelle de Nice "1977"5: 101-150
 Bank, R. A. (2017). Classification of the Recent terrestrial Gastropoda of the World. Last update: July 16th, 2017

External links

 Risso A. (1826). Histoire naturelle des principales productions de l'Europe méridionale et particulièrement de celles des environs de Nice et des Alpes Maritimes, vol. 4. Paris: Levrault. vii + 439 pp., pls 1-12.

Enidae
Gastropod genera